The 2013–14 Eastern Michigan Eagles men's basketball team represented Eastern Michigan University during the 2013–14 NCAA Division I men's basketball season. The Eagles, led by third year head coach Rob Murphy, played their home games at the Eastern Michigan University Convocation Center and were members of the West Division of the Mid-American Conference. They finished the season 22–15, 10–8 in MAC play to finish in third place in the West Division. They advanced to the semifinals of the MAC tournament where they lost to Toledo. They were invited to the CollegeInsider.com Tournament where they defeated Norfolk State in the first round before losing in the second round to Columbia.

Arrivals
Olalekan Ajayi transferred from Collin College in Plano, TX. While at Collin Ajayi ranked 17th in the nation in rebounding and was rated as the 11th best junior college player according to rivals.com. 
Ali Farhat a freshman walk-on from Dearborn HS where he was a four time All-City award winner, three time All-League and during his senior year earned All-State accolades and named to the All-Metro West Second team. 
Darell Combs joined EMU from Blinn College in Brenham, TX. Last season he led his team in points, with a 16.8pts per game average. 
Mo Hughley is a graduate student transfer from CSU-Baskersfield. Before that he was named honorable mention NCJAA All-Region and ranked 8th in Region XIV in rebounding at Paris Junior College. 
Jordan Martin a walk-on from Oakland Community College. Was a First Team All-Eastern Collegiate Conference award winner.
Jodan Price will have to sit out the 2013/14 after transferring from DePaul University.Ranked 143rd overall on Rivals.Ranked among the class of 2012’s top-25 three-point shooters by ESPN.com in high school.
Trent Perry another walk-on, attended Independence HS in Thompson Station, TN. In high school Perry was named to the District 11AAA All-Tournament Team and earned John Maher Student-Athlete of the Month.
Karrington Ward a transfer from Moraine Valley CC where he was named Skyway Conference Player of the Year and was a Division 1 National Junior College Athletic Association All-American. While at Kankakee Community College he earned Division II First Team National Junior College Athletic Association All-American status.

Departures

Awards
Academic All-MAC
Daylen Harrison,3.66 GPA, Chemistry 
Ben Jobe Award
Rob Murphy was a finalist
MAC West Players of the Week
Dec 16 Raven Lee
Feb 17 Da'Shonte Riley

Hustlebelt.com Preseason Top 25 MAC Players
10 Glenn Bryant
25 Daylen Harrison
Honorable Mention-Mike Talley
MAC Defensive Player Of The Year
 Da'Shonte Riley
3rd Team All-MAC
 Karrington Ward

Statistics
National Statistical Champions
2013/14 NCAA Statistical Championship for Field Goal Percentage Defense (36.9%)

MAC Statistical Champions
2013/14 Scoring Defense (61.4)
2013/14 Field Goal Percentage Defense (.369)
2013/14 Blocked Shots (6 Avg/G)
2013/14 Turnover Maring (+3.57)

Roster

Schedule

|-
!colspan=9 style="background:#006633; color:#FFFFFF;"| Exhibition

|-
!colspan=9 style="background:#006633; color:#FFFFFF;"| Regular season

|-
!colspan=9 style="background:#006633; color:#FFFFFF;"| MAC Tournament

|-
!colspan=9 style="background:#006633; color:#FFFFFF;"| CIT

References

Eastern Michigan Eagles men's basketball seasons
Eastern Michigan
Eastern Michigan
Eastern Michigan Eagles men's basketball
Eastern Michigan Eagles men's basketball